Rubén Torrecilla González (born 24 May 1979) is a Spanish retired footballer who played as a midfielder, and is a current manager.

He amassed Segunda División totals of 137 games and five goals over the course of seven seasons, representing five teams.

Playing career
Born in Plasencia, Cáceres, Torrecilla started his career at CF Extremadura and broke into the first team in 1999, but only appeared in eight games in two-and-a-half second division seasons combined. He moved to third level side Novelda CF midway through both the 2000–01 and 2001–02 seasons, on loan without any success.

From 2005 to 2009, after another spell with Novelda, Torrecilla played one season each in division two with CD Castellón, Ciudad de Murcia, Granada 74 CF (created upon the disappearance of the former) and Alicante CF (freshly promoted into that tier).

In January 2010, aged only 30, Torrecilla retired from football, having been released by Granada CF after not being able to recover from his knee injury after a fourth surgery. He still contributed with two goals as the club returned to the second division after 22 years of absence.

Managerial career
Shortly after retiring, Torrecilla started working as the manager of CB Alhendín's Juvenil side, before being named manager of the first team in the Regional Preferente. Ahead of the 2016–17 season, he took over FC Cubillas in the Primera Andaluza.

Torrecilla left Cubillas on 29 June 2017 after not renewing his contract, and returned to Granada shortly after, being named manager of the Juvenil B side. He became the manager of the Juvenil A team in 2018, before being named in charge of the reserve team on 15 February 2021.

On 6 March 2022, Torrecilla was named caretaker manager of Granada, after the dismissal of Robert Moreno. He made his top-flight debut six days later, in a 1–0 home loss to Elche CF. After winning and drawing once each in a five-game spell, ending with  4–1 loss at home to Levante UD, Aitor Karanka was installed in his place.

On 15 July 2022, Torrecilla was named manager of Primera División RFEF side CD Castellón. On 18 December, after just five months in charge he was sacked.

Managerial statistics

References

External links

1979 births
Living people
People from Plasencia
Sportspeople from the Province of Cáceres
Spanish footballers
Footballers from Extremadura
Association football midfielders
Segunda División players
Segunda División B players
CF Extremadura footballers
CD Castellón footballers
Ciudad de Murcia footballers
Granada 74 CF footballers
Alicante CF footballers
Granada CF footballers
Spanish football managers
La Liga managers
Primera Federación managers
Segunda División B managers
Segunda Federación managers
Granada CF managers
CD Castellón managers
Club Recreativo Granada managers